The smoky warbler (Phylloscopus fuligiventer) is a species of Old World warbler in the family Phylloscopidae. It is found in the eastern Himalayas, the Tibetan Plateau, and as an occasional vagrant to Myanmar.

References

smoky warbler
Birds of Nepal
Birds of Bhutan
Birds of Central China
Birds of Tibet
smoky warbler
Taxonomy articles created by Polbot